Jonas Bettison Warwick (1803 – 9 August 1873) was an English first-class cricketer active 1843–48 who played for Nottingham and Nottinghamshire. He was born in Woodborough, Nottinghamshire and died in Southwell, Nottinghamshire. A wicketkeeper, he played in eight first-class matches.

References

1803 births
1873 deaths
English cricketers
Nottinghamshire cricketers
Nottingham Cricket Club cricketers
North v South cricketers
People from Woodborough, Nottinghamshire
People from Southwell, Nottinghamshire
Cricketers from Nottinghamshire
Gentlemen of Southwell cricketers